The Great Cold Distance is the seventh full-length album by Swedish heavy metal band Katatonia, released on 13 March 2006. The album was recorded and mixed at Fascination Street Studios in Örebro between May and August 2005.

Release 

The album was re-released on 12 March 2007 with two bonus tracks and with the entire album in 5.1 surround sound.

There is also a special Swedish edition of the album, which came in a limited edition box with an exclusive Katatonia poster, a set of Katatonia postcards and an enhanced video of "My Twin". Music videos were also released for singles "Deliberation" and "July".

Reception 
The album is listed at number 8 on PopMatters list of the Top Metal Albums of 2006.

Track listing

Personnel 
Katatonia
 Jonas Renkse – vocals, additional guitar, keyboards, programming
 Anders Nyström – lead & rhythm guitar, backing vocals, keyboards, programming
 Fredrik Norrman – lead & rhythm guitar
 Mattias Norrman – bass
 Daniel Liljekvist – drums, backing vocals

Additional musicians
Andreas Åkeberg – backing vocals
Peter Damin – drum tech, percussion & additional drums on "Journey Through Pressure"

Production
Jens Bogren – co-production, engineering, mixing, keyboards & programming
David Castillo – co-production, engineering, mixing, keyboards & programming
Thomas Eberger – mastering
Travis Smith – album cover

Release history

Charts

References 

Katatonia albums
2006 albums
Albums produced by Jens Bogren
Alternative rock albums
Shoegaze albums